Klaus Händl (born September 17, 1969) is an Austrian actor, writer and director.

Biography
Händl was born in Rum, Tyrol, Austria. He started his theater career as an actor in Vienna's  Schauspielhaus. His first theatrical production, which he also directed, was premiered in the Styrian autumn festival Steirischer Herbst at Graz. He has also appeared in several films.

As a director, he made the feature films März in 2008, and Tomcat in 2016, both of which were credited to Händl Klaus. He is a theater and film professor at the University of Applied Arts Vienna. He lives in Vienna, Berlin, and in Port am Bielersee, Switzerland.

Works
 1994: Legenden. 35 Prosastücke. Droschl Literaturverlag Graz
 1995: Satz Bäurin. Klagenfurter Texte. Piper Verlag
 1996: Kleine Vogelkunde. Radio play. ORF
 2001: Ich ersehne die Alpen; So entstehen die Seen. Play. Rowohlt Verlag
 2002: Häftling von Mab. Libretto; music: Eduard Demetz, Theater of Tyrol
 2006: Dunkel lockende Welt. Play. Kammerspiele of Munich, Theater Biel-Solothurn in Switzerland, Burgtheater of Vienna. Rowohlt Verlag
 2006: Vom Mond. Libretto. State Theater of Tyrol
 2006: Stücke. Theater plays. Droschl Literaturverlag Graz
 2007: Wilde – Der Mann mit den traurigen Augen. Theater Basel Kleine Bühne
 2008: Dunkel lockende Welt. State Theater of Tyrol
 2008: März. Feature film
 2016: Tomcat (Kater). Feature film
 2016: Koma. Opera libretto, music by Georg Friedrich Haas). Premiere at the Schwetzingen Festival 2016
 2017: Der Mieter. Opera libretto, music by Arnulf Herrmann. Premiere at the Oper Frankfurt on 12 November 2017.
 2018: Lunea. Opera libretto, music by Heinz Holliger. Premiere at the Opernhaus Zürich on 4 March 2018.
 2019: Les Bienveillantes. Opera libretto. Opera Vlaanderen.

Awards
In 1996 Händl Klaus received an award for the Radio Play of the Year from the Austrian Broadcasting Service ORF. Other awards include the Rauriser Literaturpreis (Austria) and the Robert-Walser-Preis (Germany).
 1995: Robert-Walser-Preis, Rauris Literature Prize
 1996: ORF-Hörspielpreis "Radio Play of the Year"
 2002: Subsidy of the Literarisches Colloquium Berlin
 2002: Hermann-Lenz-Stipendium (subsidy)
 2004: Nestroy Theatre Prize nomination as best young playwright
 2005: Theater prize of the Cultural Circle of the German Economy
 2006: Playwright of the Year by the magazine Theater heute ("Theater Today")
 2007: Literature subsidies of Tyrol, Welti Dramatikerpreis of the city of Bern for playwrights, Feldkircher Lyrikpreis
 2008: Silver Leopard for the best debut feature at the Locarno International Film Festival, for the movie März
 2008: Culture Award of the city of Biel
 2008: Special Award of the Jury at the Sarajevo Film Festival for the movie März
 2008: Berner Filmpreis for the movie März
 2016: Teddy Award for the movie Tomcat (Kater)

External links
 

 Die Dinge, sind verschoben, essay by Alexander Kerlin
 Biography in the online cultural magazine perlentaucher.de

1969 births
Living people
Austrian male stage actors
German-language writers
Austrian film directors
21st-century Austrian dramatists and playwrights
Austrian male dramatists and playwrights
21st-century Austrian male writers
Austrian male television actors
Austrian male film actors
Austrian LGBT writers
Gay writers